CASA ratio stands for current and savings account ratio. CASA ratio of a bank is the ratio of deposits in current and saving accounts to total deposits. A higher CASA ratio indicates a lower cost of funds, because banks do not usually give any interests on current account deposits and the interest on saving accounts is usually very low 3-4%. If a large part of a bank's deposits comes from these funds, it means that the bank is getting those funds at a relative lower cost. It is generally understood that a higher CASA ratio leads to higher net interest margin. In India, it is used as one of the metrics to assess the profitability of a bank.

Formula

See also
 Banking in India

References

Further reading

 
 

Financial ratios